Ștefan Urâtu (born 9 January 1951) is a politician from Moldova.

Biography
Ștefan Urâtu studied at the Veterinary and Zootechnics College from Carmanova, Grigoriopol rayon (1966–1967). He carried out his compulsory military service in the Soviet army (1969–1972), in Budapest, Hungary. In 1977, he graduated from the State Pedagogical Institute from Tiraspol, the department of physics and mathematics. Between 1988–1992, Ștefan Urâtu was pro-dean of the department of physics and mathematics of the Tiraspol State University. He has published over 30 scientific articles in the area of physics of metals and applying the radioactive isotopes.

Ștefan Urâtu was a Popular Front of Moldova member of the Republican Council in the Tiraspol section between 1989–1992. He was politically detained together with the "Ilașcu Group" between 2 June and 21 August 1992.

In 1990, he founds the first non-governmental association — the Committee for Human Rights from Transnistria in the Tiraspol-based section of the Popular Front. Between 1993–2009, he was the chairman of the Helsinki Committee for Human Rights in Moldova (elected in 1993, 1998, 2006).

Ștefan Urâtu was an adviser of Mihai Ghimpu after 12 February 2010. He was a deputy in the Parliament of Moldova in 2010.

He was decorated, by a presidential decree, with Moldova's highest state decoration – the Order of the Republic.

Since 2011, Ștefan Urâtu was Vice-President of the Central Electoral Commission of the Republic of Moldova.

Awards
 The Order of the Republic - Moldova's highest state decoration

References

External links 
 Biographical Data
 Ștefan Urâtu a fost numit consilier prezidențial pe probleme politice
 Members of "Ilascu Group", awarded „Ordinul Republicii"
  Jurnal de Chişinău, Membrii grupului Ilaşcu, decoraţi cu Ordinul Republicii

1951 births
Living people
Moldovan activists
Ilașcu Group
Popular Front of Moldova politicians
Politics of Transnistria
History of Transnistria since 1991
Moldovan human rights activists
People from Dubăsari District
Recipients of the Order of the Republic (Moldova)